Gachilbong (가칠봉 / 加漆峰) is a mountain of South Korea. It has an elevation of 1,164 metres

See also
List of mountains of Korea

References

Mountains of South Korea
One-thousanders of South Korea